In the mathematical areas of order and lattice theory, the Kleene fixed-point theorem, named after American mathematician Stephen Cole Kleene, states the following:

Kleene Fixed-Point Theorem. Suppose  is a directed-complete partial order (dcpo) with a least element, and let  be a Scott-continuous (and therefore monotone) function. Then  has a least fixed point, which is the supremum of the ascending Kleene chain of 

The ascending Kleene chain of f is the chain

obtained by iterating f on the least element ⊥ of L. Expressed in a formula, the theorem states that

where  denotes the least fixed point.

Although Tarski's fixed point theorem 
does not consider how fixed points can be computed by iterating f from some seed  (also, it pertains to monotone functions on complete lattices), this result is often attributed to Alfred Tarski who proves it for additive functions   Moreover, Kleene Fixed-Point Theorem can be extended to monotone functions using transfinite iterations.

Proof 

To show that, we prove the following:

Lemma.

Proof. We use induction: 
 Assume n = 0. Then  since  is the least element.
 Assume n > 0. Then we have to show that . By rearranging we get . By inductive assumption, we know that  holds, and because f is monotone (property of Scott-continuous functions), the result holds as well.

As a corollary of the Lemma we have the following directed ω-chain:

From the definition of a dcpo it follows that  has a supremum, call it  What remains now is to show that  is the least fixed-point.

First, we show that  is a fixed point, i.e. that . Also, since  and because  has no influence in determining the supremum we have: .

We now prove by induction over  that . As the induction hypothesis, we may assume that .

See also 
 Other fixed-point theorems

References 

Order theory
Fixed-point theorems